Jachin may refer to:
Jachin (biblical figure), a minor biblical figure
The right pillar in front of Solomon's Temple named after Jachin; see Boaz and Jachin